Rudolph de Harak, also Rudy de Harak (April 10, 1924 – April 24, 2002), was an American graphic designer. De Harak was notable as a designer who covered a broad spectrum of applications with a distinctly modernist aesthetic. He was also influential as a professor of design.

Career

De Harak was born in Culver City, California. After serving in World War II, de Harak was influenced by two lectures given by Will Burtin and György Kepes which compelled him to pursue graphic design. Along with Saul Bass, Alvin Lustig and others, de Harak helped found the Los Angeles Society for Contemporary Designers before he moved to New York City to become art director for Seventeen for just 18 months. At the same time, de Harak drew illustrations for Esquire and soon began his long tenure in teaching.  De Harak served "as the Frank Stanton Professor of Design, for a quarter century at the Cooper Union, and visiting professor at Yale, Alfred University, Parsons, Pratt Institute and other schools."

He designed a three-story digital clock installed on the exterior of 200 Water St. (previously 127 John St.) in New York City. The clock consists of "72 square modules with numerals that light according to date, hour, minute and second". He also designed a neon-illuminated entrance and a scaffold covered with brightly covered canvas outside.

De Harak was a member of the 1989 Art Directors Club Hall of Fame. He was the recipient of a 1992 AIGA Medal.

Influences 
De Harak's work was influenced by modernism and the International Typographic Style. He was also influenced by abstract expressionism, Dada, op art and pop art.

References

Notes
 Heller, Steven, "Rudolph de Harak, 78, Artist And Environmental Designer", The New York Times, April 30, 2002. The New York Times
 Heller, Steven, "Rudolph de Harak – A Playful Modernist", Baseline 45, edited by Mike Daines and Hans Dieter Reichert, Bradbourne Publishing, 2004.
 Heller, Steven, "A Humanist's Modernist", AIGA Medalists at aiga.org A Humanist's Modernist
 Forester, Russel, "Rudolph de Harak", Graphic Design Archive at rit.edu Rudolph de Harak, Graphic Design Archive at rit.edu
 "Rudolph de Harak", the 1989 Art Directors Club Hall of Fame at adcglobal.org 1989 Art Directors Club Hall of Fame at adcglobal.org

1924 births
2002 deaths
American graphic designers
Cooper Union faculty

AIGA medalists